Summer Pack is the third extended play recorded by American musician Donald Glover, under his stage name Childish Gambino. It was released by Wolf+Rothstein, Liberator Music and RCA Records on July 11, 2018. It contains only two songs, "Summertime Magic" and "Feels Like Summer". The EP was produced by Glover and his longtime collaborator, Ludwig Göransson. It was revealed to the public via social media shortly after its release in a surprise manner.

Background and release
Following the release of his 2016 album "Awaken, My Love!" and the 2018 re-issue of his debut project EP, Glover released the hit single "This Is America", which became both his first number one and top ten song on the US Billboard Hot 100. The track also reached number one on the charts of Australia, Canada and New Zealand, and peaked within the top ten of the charts in eight other countries. The song was nominated for four Grammy Awards at the 61st Annual Grammy Awards and won two. Two months following the release of the hit single, Gambino announced the surprise release of the two-song EP Summer Pack on July 11, 2018 featuring the songs "Summertime Magic" and "Feels Like Summer".

Both songs appear in the 2019 film Guava Island, which stars Donald Glover, and features other music from Childish Gambino.

Track listing
Both tracks written and produced by Donald Glover and Ludwig Göransson. Credits adapted from Tidal.

Release history

References

2018 EPs
RCA Records albums
Donald Glover albums